The Lost Planet is a 1953 American horror science fiction serial film 15-chapter serial which has the distinction of being the last interplanetary-themed sound serial ever made.  It was directed by Spencer Gordon Bennet with a screenplay by George H. Plympton and Arthur Hoerl (who also wrote for
Rocky Jones, Space Ranger). It appears to have been planned as a sequel to the earlier chapterplay Captain Video: Master of the Stratosphere and shares many plot-points, props and sets, as well as some of the same cast.  However, the Video Rangers do not appear, and their uniforms are instead worn by "slaves" created electronically by Reckov, the dictator of the Lost Planet (Gene Roth) with the help of mad scientist Dr. Grood (Michael Fox) and enslaved "good" scientist Professor Dorn (Forrest Taylor).

Plotline
Dr. Ernst Grood has succeeded in winning control over the planet Ergro as the first step in his desired conquest of the Universe. Reporter Rex Barrow, his photographer Tim Johnson, Professor Edmund Dorn and his daughter Ella are all captured by Grood, who plans to make use of the professor's knowledge. With the help of the professor's inventions, Rex is able to free Ergro of Grood's domination, while Grood is sent on an endless voyage into space.

Cast
 Judd Holdren as Rex Barrow
 Vivian Mason as Ella Dorn
 Ted Thorpe as Tim Johnson 
 Forrest Taylor as Prof. Edmund Dorn
 Michael Fox as Dr. Ernst Grood
 Gene Roth as Reckov
 Karl Davis as Karlo – aka Robot R-4
 Leonard Penn as Ken Wopler
 John Cason as Hopper
 Nick Stuart as Darl 
 Joseph Mell as Lah
 Jack George as Jarva
 Frederic Berest as Alden
 I. Stanford Jolley as Robot No. 9
 Pierre Watkin as Ned Hilton

Unlike the Captain Video serial, The Lost Planet has a female character, Professor Dorn's daughter Ella (Vivian Mason) who strides about the Lost Planet (Bronson Canyon) in a fetching female version of the Video Ranger uniform.  The hero is not Captain Video, but a newspaper reporter, Rex Barrow, played by Judd Holdren (who had previously played Captain Video and Commando Cody).

Production
The Lost Planet was the last of only three science fiction serials released by Columbia.

This serial was, despite the characters' names, essentially a sequel to Captain Video, from which stock footage was taken for this serial.

It was originally known as The Planet Men.

Michael Fox recalled that writer George Plympton would deliberately write lines that he thought the actors couldn't say such as "The atom propulse set up a radiation wall which cut off the neutron detonator impulse!"

Critical reception
In the opinions of Harmon and Glut, The Lost Planet is a "rather shoddy, low budget space cliffhanger."

Chapter titles
 Mystery of the Guided Missile
 Trapped by the Axial Propeller
 Blasted by the Thermic Disintegrator
 The Mind Control Machine
 The Atomic Plane
 Disaster in the Stratosphere
 Snared by the Prysmic Catapult
 Astray in Space
 The Hypnotic Ray Machine
 To Free the Planet People
 Dr. Grood Defies Gravity
 Trapped in a Cosmo Jet
 The Invisible Enemy
 In the Grip of the De-Thermo Ray
 Sentenced to Space
Source:

See also 
 List of film serials
 List of film serials by studio

References

 Science Fiction Serials by Roy Kinnard (McFarland, North Carolina, 1998).

External links
 
 
 Roaring Rockets Serial Page
 Gary Johnson: "The Serials"

1953 films
1950s English-language films
1950s science fiction horror films
American black-and-white films
Columbia Pictures film serials
Films directed by Spencer Gordon Bennet
Films set on fictional planets
American aviation films
American science fiction horror films
Films with screenplays by George H. Plympton
1950s American films